WSNT-FM (99.9 FM) is a radio station broadcasting a country music format, licensed to Sandersville, Georgia, United States. The station is currently owned by Radio Station Wsnt, Inc. and has programming from ABC Radio.

History
The station went on the air as WSNT-FM on 30 November 1981. On 17 March 2005, the station changed its call sign to DWSNT-FM and on 31 January 2007 to the current WSNT.

References

External links

SNT-FM
Radio stations established in 1981